Eremiaphilidae is a small Old World family of praying mantids, based on the type genus Eremiaphila.  As part of a major revision of mantid taxonomy, this family now contains the subfamily Tarachodinae, which includes tribes and genera previously placed in the now obsolete Tarachodidae.

The new placement means that this taxon is characteristic of the superfamily Eremiaphiloidea (of group Cernomantodea) and infraorder Schizomantodea.  Genera in this family have been recorded from: Africa and Asia.

Subfamilies, tribes and selected genera  
The Mantodea Species File lists four subfamilies:

Eremiaphilinae 
Species in this small, original subfamily are frequently wingless or brachypterous, and commonly encountered in desert environments, from Egypt to temperate Asia. Their coloration often matches that of the sand or rocks in the habitat.
 Eremiaphila Lefebvre, 1835
 Heteronutarsus Lefebvre, 1835

Iridinae 
 tribe Didymocoryphini (monotypic)
 Didymocorypha Wood-Mason, 1877
 tribe Dysaulini
 Dysaules Stal, 1877
 tribe Iridini
 Iris Saussure, 1869
 tribe Schizocephalini (monotypic: was subfamily Schizocephalinae)
 Schizocephala Serville, 1831

Parathespinae
 Parathespis Saussure, 1869

Tarachodinae 

tribe Oxyelaeini
 Charieis Burr, 1900
Oxyelaea Giglio-Tos, 1917
tribe Tarachodini
 subtribe Antistiina
Antistia Stal, 1876
Ariusia Stal, 1877
 subtribe Tarachodina
Galepsus Stal, 1876
Metagalepsus Roy, 1971
Nesogalepsus
Nothogalepsus
Oxyophthalmellus
Paragalepsus
Paralygdamia
Paroxyophthalmus
Plastogalepsus
Pseudogalepsus
Pyrgomantis
Tarachodella
Tarachodes Burmeister, 1838
Tarachodula
Tuberculepsus Roy, 2008

References

External links
Tree of Life - Eremiaphilidae

 
Mantodea families